Fulgence de Bury, real name: Joseph Désiré Fulgence de Bury (1 March 1785 – 23 June 1845) was a 19th-century French playwright.

A civil servant in the administration, he became known under the pen name Fulgence. His theatre plays were presented on the most important Parisian stages including the Théâtre du Palais-Royal, the Opéra-Comique, the Théâtre de l'Odéon, the Théâtre du Gymnase, and the Théâtre des Variétés.

Works 
1815: Turenne, ou Un trait de modestie, historical comédie en vaudeville in 1 act, with Achille d'Artois
1816: La Bataille de Denain, opéra comique in 3 acts, with Armand d'Artois and Emmanuel Théaulon
1819: Un moment d'imprudence, comedy in 3 acts
1819: Le Moulin de Bayard, historical vaudeville in 1 act, with Marc-Michel and Charles Nombret Saint-Laurent
1820: L'Autre Henri, ou l'An 1880, comedy in 3 acts, in prose, with Théaulon and Pierre Capelle
1820: L'Invisible, ou la Curiosité d'une veuve, comédie en vaudevilles in 1 act, with Achille d'Artois
1821: Le Baptême de village, ou le Parrain de circonstance, vaudeville in 1 act, with Marc-Antoine Désaugiers, Michel-Joseph Gentil de Chavagnac, Paul Ledoux and Ramond de la Croisette
1821: Un Jeu de Bourse, ou la Bascule, comedy in 1 act
1821: Les deux ménages, comedy in three acts, with Louis-Benoît Picard and Alexis Jacques Marie Vafflard
1822: Une visite aux Invalides, à-propos mingled with couplets, with Michel-Joseph Gentil de Chavagnac and Paul Ledoux
1823: Le comte d'Angoulême, ou Le siège de Gênes, with Michel-Joseph Gentil de Chavagnac, Paul Ledoux and Ramond de la Croisette
1824: Le célibataire et l'homme marié, comedy in three acts and in prose, with Alexis Jacques Marie Vafflard
1824: Grétry, opéra comique in 1 act, with Paul Ledoux and Ramond de la Croisette
1824: Le Voyage à Dieppe, with Alexis Jacques M. Wafflard, comedy in 3 acts
1825: Le Béarnais, ou la Jeunesse de Henri IV, comedy in 1 act and in free verses, with Paul Ledoux, Ramond de la Croisette
1827: Le Mari par intérim, comédie en vaudevilles in 1 act, with Charles Nombret Saint-Laurent and Henri de Tully
1829: L'humoriste, vaudeville in 1 act, with Charles Dupeuty and Henri de Tully
1833: Louis XI en goguettes, vaudeville in 1 act, with Alexis Decomberousse
1840: Une journée chez Mazarin, comedy in 1 act, mingled with couplets, with Alexis Decomberousse and Théodore Muret

Bibliography 
 Théophile Astrie, Les cimetières de Paris, 1865, p. 158

External links 
 Fulgence de Bury on Data.bnf.fr
 L’Illustration, 1843-1845, p.291 (nécrologie)
 IdrefWorldcat

19th-century French dramatists and playwrights
Writers from Paris
1785 births
1845 deaths